The 2022 Tour of Britain was a men's professional road cycling stage race. It was the eighteenth running of the modern version of the Tour of Britain and the 81st British tour in total. The race was part of the 2022 UCI ProSeries.

The Tour of Britain started on 4 September in Aberdeen. The race had been scheduled for eight stages, concluding on 11 September on the Isle of Wight, the first planned finish on the island. On 8 September, the race was cancelled and declared complete after five stages due to the death of Elizabeth II.

Route
On 1 October 2021, the start and finish venues were announced, with the Grand Départ leaving Aberdeen on 4 September 2022 and the final stage held on the Isle of Wight on 11 September. The tour was to visit Dorset for the first time, and return to Yorkshire for the first time since 2009. Nottinghamshire was to host one of the midweek stages.

On 8 September, the final three stages of the race were cancelled due to the death of Elizabeth II. The race was declared complete, with classifications after the fifth stage considered the final result.

Cancelled stages

Stages

Stage 1 
4 September 2022 — Aberdeen to Glenshee Ski Centre, 

After over 110 miles the race finished with a nine kilometre climb up the Old Military Road to the Glenshee ski station. Neo-Pro Corbin Strong from New Zealand beat two Spanish cyclists at the finish.

Stage 2 
5 September 2022 — Hawick to Duns, 

The stage started at Hawick and passed through Jedburgh and Morebattle before finishing in Duns after a journey of nearly 110 miles. At the start of the stage the race leader was the New Zealand rider Corbin Strong who had won the first stage in Aberdeen.

Stage 3 
6 September 2022 — Durham to Sunderland,

Stage 4 
7 September 2022 — Redcar to Duncombe Park, Helmsley,

Stage 5 
8 September 2022 — West Bridgford to Mansfield,

Classification leadership table

References

Tour of Britain
2022
Tour of Britain
Tour of Britain
Sport on the Isle of Wight